Duan Suying (died 1009), also known by his posthumous name as the Emperor Zhaoming of Dali, was the sixth emperor of the Dali Kingdom. His reign lasted from 985 to 1009.

He was a descendant of Duan Siliang and the son of his predecessor Duan Sushun. After his death, he was succeeded by his son Duan Sulian.

He valued Confucianism and initiated the imperial examination system in Dali, likely in 1000. The later claim that he authored a version of the Buddhist work Transmission of the Lamp, while not completely impossible, is considered unlikely.

Diplomacy
In 989 or some time during 991–995, Duan Suying sent a letter to Emperor Taizong of Song pleading the latter to conduct the fengshan ceremony. Duan's letter is now lost, but the reply written by Wang Yucheng on the Song emperor's behalf, which rejected the proposal, has survived as "A Reply to the Nanzhao King's Request for the Eastern Feng Ceremony". Duan likely sent the messenger to better understand the Chinese emperor.

In 993, an agrarian rebellion led by Wang Xiaobo and Li Shun engulfed the Song Xichuan Circuit (now Sichuan), and the Song huanguan (eunuch) general Wang Ji'en led an army to suppress it. Many Chinese refugees crossed the Jinsha River and entered Dali, and this likely played a major role in Duan Suying's adoption of Confucianism and the imperial examination system. Between 994 and 995, after the Song recovered most of Xichuan, it sent a diplomat named Xin Yixian to the Dali capital Yangjumie as part of its counterinsurgency campaign. Xin Yixian later wrote a book titled Records of Yunnan During the Zhidao Period (zhidao referring to the years 995–997).

In 996, Duan Suying sent another mission led by Duan Yuanshun to the Song capital, where they were "warmly received". In addition, Dali sent tributes to Song in 985, 989, 991, 997, 999, 1005, and 1008.

Era names
Duan Suying used at least five era names:
Guangming (986–988?)
Mingsheng (989?–996)
Mingzhi (997–?)
Mingtong (?–1005)
Mingying (1006–?)

The first year of mingtong was after 1000, and mingying lasted until at least 1007. These era names suggest a prosperous economy and a stable society under him.

References 

Dali emperors

10th-century Chinese monarchs
Year of birth missing
1009 deaths